Armored Moon: The Next Eden is a 1998 real-time strategy video game from Korean company Sung Jin Multimedia.

Reception

Computer Games Magazine gave the game a score of 3 out of 5, stating: "Armored Moon includes ten missions, which isn't much by today's gaming standards, and the game probably won't be in contention for Game of the Year—it lacks the glitz and longevity of some of its more expensive real-time brethren. But for half the price of those titles, this software packs quite a gaming wallop"

References

1998 video games
DOS games
DOS-only games
Real-time strategy video games
Video games developed in South Korea